Nosovskaya is the name of several rural localities in Russia:
Nosovskaya, Rovdinsky Selsoviet, Shenkursky District, Arkhangelsk Oblast, a village in Rovdinsky Selsoviet of Shenkursky District, Arkhangelsk Oblast
Nosovskaya, Fedorogorsky Selsoviet, Shenkursky District, Arkhangelsk Oblast, a village in Fedorogorsky Selsoviet of Shenkursky District, Arkhangelsk Oblast